Yevgenia Yurievna Uvarkina (born May 30, 1974) is a Russian businesswoman and politician. Since April 1, 2019  — Мayor of Lipetsk.

Born on May 30, 1974 in the urban-type settlement  Omsukchan,  Omsukchansky District of Magadan Oblast, Soviet Union. In 1977, she moved to Lipetsk with her family. After school, she entered the Lipetsk Ecology and Humanities Institute, specializing in economics, and graduated in 1996.

Holds the position of Chairman of the Board of Directors of the Association of Agricultural Producers of the Lipetsk Oblast.  Uvarkina joined the Civic Chamber of the Russian Federation in March 2017, where she was Chairman of the Commission for the Development of the Agro-Industrial Complex and Rural Territories.

On March 29, 2019, the head of the Lipetsk administration, Sergei Ivanov, appointed  Uvarkina as first deputy. Before the elections, the new mayor of the Lipetsk  council acts as head.  In the post of head of Lipetsk was involved in the anti-semitic scandal.

She is married to Gennady Uvarkin with six children: two sons and four daughters.

References

External links
 Бизнес по-семейному

1974 births
Living people
People from Magadan Oblast
Members of the Civic Chamber of the Russian Federation
Mayors of places in Russia
21st-century Russian politicians
Russian women in politics
Russian women in business
21st-century Russian women politicians